Air Mauritius was set up in .

Shanghai became the  destination served by the company in early . During 2012, the airline suspended its services to Frankfurt, Geneva, Melbourne, Milan and Sydney. At , the airline's five top routes in terms of available seats were Mauritius–Reunion, Mauritius–Paris, Mauritius–Johannesburg, Mauritius–Antananarivo and Mauritius–London; the biggest international markets served by the carrier in terms of seat capacity were Southern Africa and Western Europe.

Following is a list of destinations Air Mauritius flies to according to their passenger scheduled services, . The table below provides each country served along with the destinations the airline flies to, as well as the name of the airports served. Terminated destinations are also listed.

List

References

External links

 
 

Air Mauritius